Gerald Aungier (1640 – 30 June 1677) was the 2nd Governor of Bombay. He was made the president of the Surat factory and the governor of Bombay in 1669, which posts he held until his death in 1677. He was responsible for the initial growth of the city. He is said to have famously quoted Bombay to be "the city which by God's assistance is intended to be built".

It was during his tenure that the small town island of Bombay was converted into a promising hub for commerce. Great care was taken to bring the best traders, artisans and other professions to settle in Bombay. He is credited with adopting principles of religious toleration, empowered local self-governments and a strong focus on commerce ably supported by the creation of courts and enforcement through the formation of the local militia of Bhandari youth which evolved into the Bombay Police.

Encyclopædia Britannica, 11th Edition, Volume 4, Slice 2 states that he was brother of Francis Aungier, 3rd Lord Aungier of Longford and 1st Earl of Longford in Ireland. Though significant research on the life and work of Gerald Aungier is not readily available, his contribution in shaping Bombay is broadly recognised by early prominent historians Da Cunha, Douglas and Edwardes in their separate works. Historian Phirozshah Malabari dedicates a full chapter to Gerald Aungier in his book Bombay in the Making.

Historian S. M. Edwardes states Aungier's great work was:
"to weld into one homogeneous mass the discordant materials of Asiatic nationalities, to solve the problem which had never been solved before, as to how a great multitude of men of diverse religions and races should live together in peace and harmony, free from discord within and aggression without — this was the work he set himself to do, and he did it."

Early life
Little is known of the early years of Gerald Aungier in India, much less of his childhood and youth in England. He was born in 1640, the second son of Rev. Ambrose Aungier, Prebendary of St. Patrick's Cathedral, Dublin and Grisel Bulkeley, daughter of the Archbishop of Dublin, Lancelot Bulkeley. He was the grandson of Francis Aungier, 1st Baron Aungier of Longford

His name enabled Historian Douglas to surmise that he came from the French town of Angers and his forefathers probably fled to England after the terrible massacre of Protestants on the eve of St. Bartholomew in 1572.

Young Aungier in all likelihood trained in England and must have had a fairly good education, evidenced by the countless letters he wrote to his masters in England and his subordinates in Bombay which display an extensive and wholesome reading.

Career
Like Sir George Oxenden (governor), Aungier entered the service of the Company at an early age and rose in rank step by step. He was appointed as a Factor for Surat in November 1661, and by 1663 he occupied the post of warehouse keeper at Surat.
He was deputed by the Surat factory to accompany the Earl of Marlborough when the latter claimed the town and island of Bombay in 1662 on behalf of the King of Great Britain.

On the death of Sir George Oxenden on 14 July 1669, Aungier became the President of the Surat factory, a post which then carried with it the governorship of the port and island of Bombay.

Relationship with native powers
Aungier was also at the helm in Surat on 3 October 1670 when Shivaji invaded Surat. He secured the British settlement and saved the lives and property within their fortifications.

He showed great wisdom in managing both Mughal and Maratha aggressions. His constant reply to both was that the British were merchants and cannot take one side or the other. He sent envoys to Shivaji thrice and made treaties with Shivaji. His ambassadors were present at Shivaji's coronation.

Governorship of Bombay
Aungier embarked at Surat on 11 January 1670 and arrived in Bombay a few days later. The town was rife with many allegations of improprieties against Deputy Governor Captain Henry Young, and Aungier's immediate task was to investigate these allegations. He immediately set about defining the rules and regulations based on which Bombay must be governed and without which other reforms would be useless. Learning from the incessant perils of wars and tyranny being faced by traders in Surat, his first idea was that the city needed absolute peace and security. He therefore set out to set up the courts of Judicature and strengthening the fortifications of Bombay. He also initiated a survey of Bombay with a view of ascertaining the island's total land revenue. Although this trip lasted just under a month, it had set the foundations for future work.

1671 found Aungier frustrated as he was stranded at Surat, first by the disturbances/delays created by the Mughal Governor and later by the advent of Shivaji. This strengthened his resolve to move the seat of government from Surat to Bombay, a suggestion that was finally implemented after his death in 1687.

The revenue survey of Bombay indicated that the cost of upkeep far exceeded the revenues collected. Aungier implemented a set of measures that would encourage commerce at one end and improve tax collections on the other. He placed very high importance in the justice system being credible that would give confidence to all those residing on the island. He felt the European system may not meet the demands of Indian natives.

Setting up Panchayats
Realising the importance of being able to attract the wealthy traders and merchants from Surat to Bombay, he set up Panchayats based on each community, something that expanded access of justice and governance to not only the wealthy but also the poorest within each community. This one master stroke, created healthy competition amongst communities and ensured proper law and order as each Panchayat became responsible for their community's conduct.

Property titles
While ceding Bombay to the British, the local Portuguese government did everything in its power to make the transition difficult. One such measure was to declare that most of the lands of any value was the property of private individuals and hence could not be ceded to the crown or company. Aungier created an amicable settlement on property titles by arranging residents to pay annual quit rents in lieu of better administration.

Acquisition of Colaba and Old Woman Island
Aungier negotiated the acquisition of the islands of Colaba and Old Woman from the Portuguese

Company patent to Neema Parrack
Neema Parrack was a reputed Banya trader based in Diu, who presented certain conditions before moving to Bombay. He demanded a patent under the seal of the company that secured him and his community the right of practicing their religion not only to themselves but in perpetuity to their descendants. Though instances of religious toleration by rulers abound in medieval Indian history, this may be one of the first instances of a government granting a patent guaranteeing religious toleration. The patent was granted by Aungier on 22 March 1677.

Making Bombay the seat of British presidency in Western India
Aungier proposed the shifting of Presidency of West India to Bombay, something that finally took effect many years after his death on 2 May 1687

Bhandari Militia
Aungier engaged the services of around 600 Bhandari Militia men who were maintained by 100 of the principal landowners of the island. He organized the Bhandari Militia with Subhedars headquartered at Mahim, Sewree and Sion.

Establishment of the Mint
An event which attracted the wealthy trader population was the establishment of a Mint in 1676 for the coinage of "rupees, pies and bujurks". Tavernier who reported in 1678 that the currency was circulated within the fort precincts and some two or three leagues in the country.

First execution in Bombay under British law
Aungier was called in 1674 to quell a mutiny by English soldiers, and the first execution by British law as far as we can learn in Bombay was ordered by him. The execution took place on 21 October 1674 when Corporal Fake was shot.

Accomplishments and legacy
Although the Portuguese king had ceded all the islands of Bombay to the British king Charles II of England, the Portuguese in India refused to hand over the territory. It was not till 1675 that Aungier actually took possession of Colaba and Old Woman's Island, thus completing the transfer of power to the British. His plan of fortifying the main island, from Dongri in the north to the harbour, had to wait until 1715 for completion, when Charles Boone became the governor of the town.

He offered various inducements to skilled workers and traders to set up business in Bombay. His offers were tempting enough to lure many traders and artisans from Gujarat to the newly developing town. As a result Bombay registered its first population boom. Between 1661 and 1675 there was a sixfold increase in population.

Aungier ceded land near the Malabar Hill to immigrant Parsi workers and traders for a Tower of Silence. It was during his governorship, in 1670, that the first printing press was imported and set up in Bombay.

Bombay's population was around 10,000 people when Aungier assumed charge and had grown to 80,000 by the time of his death eight years later. The revenue too had grown from GBP 2,823 to GBP 9,254.

During Aungier's governorship of Bombay the foundation stone of St. Thomas Church was laid. A silver chalice presented by Aungier to the Anglican Christian community in 1675 is among the historic treasures of the now diocesan cathedral.

Aungier died in Surat on 30 June 1677. His tomb lies close to that of Sir George Oxenden. His grave was unmarked for many years and was finally identified and a tablet was installed under instructions from Lord Curzon in 1916

References

Bombay and Western India by James Douglas, 1893
Rise of Bombay: A Retrospect by S M Edwardes, 1902

External links
Bombay: History of a City

 

1640s births
1677 deaths
History of Mumbai
Governors of Bombay
Year of birth unknown